This is a list of characters from the Pakistani TV serial Main Abdul Qadir Hoon that aired on Hum TV.

Abdul Qadir

Abdul Qadir is the main character of the serial that is portrayed by Fahad Mustafa. The character goes through three different stages of life throughout the serial. He is the son of a rich and arrogant fashion designer Meera and a businessman named Siddiq. He is the student of O'Level and lives in Karachi. He is a mentally challenged boy. He is a very young man but his characteristics are of little kids. He returns to his house during his summer vacations but becomes upset when he sees his parents quarrelling with each other. His mother wants him to live his life according to her wishes that makes him upset. Abdul Qadir makes friends with Zareen, a girl in his neighbourhood. However, Zareen is a very spoilt girl. Abdul Qadir starts roaming around with Zareen and her friends and learns very bad habits like smoking and drinking. He even disobeys his parents and misbehaves with them. His mother fixes his marriage with Ayesha, the daughter of her friend but Abdul Qadir has fallen in love with Zareen. He informs her that he is in love with Zareen and Ayesha moves out of Abdul Qadir's life. Abdul Qadir proposes Zareen but she rejects his proposal. Abdul Qadir becomes upset and faints. He is admitted to hospital and his life is totally ruined. He gets to know that Zareen married her best friend Pasha. Abdul Qadir's mother decides to send him to Europe for further studies. He is reluctant but finally agrees to go to Europe.

In Europe, Abdul Qadir changes drastically. It is the second stage of the character in the serial. He has become a normal but a flirt and spoilt boy. He flirts with girls and makes friends with bad boys as well as a Pakistani young man named Faiz Rasool, who is the son of a Maulvi. Faiz is a very good guy by nature but he has very bad habits. Abdul Qadir's mother insults Faiz and orders him to leave Abdul Qadir. When Abdul Qadir gets to know about the situation, he misbehaves with his mother as she comes to visit him. He tells Faiz about the situation and Faiz advises him to obey his mother. Under Faiz's friendship, Abdul Qadir starts to learn about Islam. He keeps Nell Jones as his housekeeper, who is a Christian by religion as her father was a Christian but her mother is a Muslim. She starts asking Abdul Qadir about Islam that frustrates him and he starts hating and insulting Nell. However, he makes friends with her as he is impressed by her Islamic ways. Faiz sees Nell at Abdul Qadir's home and tells him that she is a prostitute. Abdul Qadir tries to rape Nell after a party due to her past as a prostitute but Nell requests her to let her go for the sake of Allah and the prophet Mohammad. Abdul Qadir is shocked to hear that and he lets her go. He realizes that he has done a big mistake by trying to misbehave with her. A few days later, he visits her in the hospital as she is suffering from AIDS. Abdul Qadir starts looking after her and brings her to his house. A great change comes in Abdul Qadir's behaviour. He has developed interest in Islam and he starts telling Nell about Islam. He falls in love with her and proposes her but Nell refuses because she is on the stage of death. Abdul Qadir starts studying Quran and Hadith and preaches Nell about Islam. She accepts Islam and Abdul Qadir marries her. The two visit a mosque and check out the great architecture of the mosque. However, on the second night of the marriage, Nell dies as Abdul Qadir is talking to her. This brings a very sad moment for Abdul Qadir. He is heartbroken by the death of his beloved wife.

Following the death of Nell, the third stage of the character appears. Abdul Qadir surprisingly shows up at a party at his house in Karachi that is held by his parents. Everyone is surprised to see Abdul Qadir in a new look that is of a Maulvi, sporting a full beard on his face and wearing Shalwar kameez. His mother Meera starts objecting Abdul Qadir's new look and continues to throw insults at him. However, Abdul Qadir ignores all that and starts respecting his mother and has developed a very nice behaviour with everyone. He is respectful to his parents and also saves Ayesha from destroying her life as she is going to marry Jawad. Abdul Qadir repeatedly warns her not to marry Jawad because he is bad (he knows him as they were once friends). However, Ayesha does not believe him but learns about Jawad when he is caught with two girls by her. She apologizes to Abdul Qadir and is impressed by him. She starts getting interested into him and wants to marry him. Abdul Qadir and Ayesha's mothers want to get both of them married but Abdul Qadir puts a condition in front of his mother that Ayesha must know about his first marriage with Nell. He does not want to betray her. Abdul Qadir starts visiting his friend Faiz's father and the two make friends. Abdul Qadir regularly goes to meet Faiz's father and discuss Islam and various personal issues with him. Abdul Qadir also helps his gardener's son to take admission in a school, where the Principal makes bad comments on the boy because the boy is a Christian but Abdul Qadir tells him that as a Muslim, he should treat Christian like the Muslim children. Meera is upset with Abdul Qadir's new lifestyle of offering namaz and becoming a Maulvi. She hires Zareen and orders her to come back into Abdul Qadir's life and make him the original Abdul Qadir. Zareen befriends him and the two start their friendship once again. However, one night, Abdul Qadir overhears that Zareen is hired by Meera as she is arguing with her former husband Pasha. Pasha tries to rape her and Abdul Qadir saves her from Pasha. Zareen realizes that Abdul Qadir knows about everything. Abdul Qadir is heartbroken that his mother has been conspiring against him and he leaves his house and writes a letter to his mother that he has to go in urgency. He goes to Europe to meet his sick friend Faiz and promises to take him to his father. However, Faiz dies and the sad Abdul Qadir has to take Faiz's dead body to Pakistan. Abdul Qadir returns home where his mother tells him that he has to prepare as they are going to Zareen's marriage. Abdul Qadir starts crying that Zareen is getting married but goes with his mother to Zareen's house where he realizes that he is the bridegroom. Abdul Qadir happily marries his first love and they start their happily married life.

Main Abdul Qadir Hoon
Main Abdul Qadir Hoon